Kathleen Peirce (born 1956, Moline, Illinois, United States) is an American poet. She graduated from the Iowa Writer's Workshop in 1988.  She currently teaches at Texas State University in San Marcos, Texas, for the Texas State University MFA. She has one son.

Awards
 1990 Association of Writers & Writing Programs Award for Mercy 
 1993 Whiting Award
 1998 Iowa Poetry Prize for The Oval Hour
 2000 William Carlos Williams Award for The Oval Hour
 2005 National Endowment for the Arts Fellowship 
 2007 Guggenheim Fellowship

Works
"Anima Forma Corporis"; "Confession 3.10.18"; "Apart", Reading Between A&B
"Measure", Blackbird
"Redbird", Nothing to Say and Saying It
"Anima Forma Corporis", courtland Review

Bibliography
Mercy, Pittsburgh, University of Pittsburgh Press, 1991, 
Divided Touch, Divided Color, Windhover, 1995
The Oval Hour University of Iowa Press, 1999, 
The Ardors, Ausable Press, 2004,

References

External links
Ausable Press
Texas State MFA
Profile at The Whiting Foundation

1956 births
Living people
American women poets
Texas State University faculty
Iowa Writers' Workshop alumni
People from Moline, Illinois
National Endowment for the Arts Fellows
American women academics
21st-century American women